Joan and Leslie was a British television situation comedy series which aired from 1955 to 1958, starring Noel Dyson, Leslie Randall, Joan Reynolds, and Harry Towb. Produced by Associated Television (ATV), all episodes are missing, believed to be lost.

Leslie Randall and his real life wife Joan Reynolds played the title roles. An Australian adaptation of the series was produced in 1969, which followed the characters of Joan and Leslie migrating to Australia.

Cast
Noel Dyson as	 Mrs. Henshaw
Leslie Randall		
Joan Reynolds		
Harry Towb

See also 
 Joan and Leslie (Australian TV series)

References

External links
Joan and Leslie on IMDb

1955 British television series debuts
1958 British television series endings
Lost television shows
English-language television shows
ITV sitcoms
1950s British comedy television series